Vernon Souter (26 February 1894 – 17 July 1915) was an Australian cricketer. He played eight first-class cricket matches for Victoria between 1914 and 1915.

See also
 List of Victoria first-class cricketers

References

External links
 

1894 births
1915 deaths
Australian cricketers
Victoria cricketers
Sportspeople from Wagga Wagga